The beautiful short-fingered gecko (Trigonodactylus pulcher) is a gecko species in the genus Trigonodactylus. It is found in  Saudi Arabia and Yemen.

Etymology 
Beautiful short-fingered gecko is named after Latin pulcher, meaning beautiful and fair.

Habitat 
This species occurs in sandy habitats close to the sea, including sand dunes. It can be locally common.

References 

pulcher
Reptiles of the Arabian Peninsula
Reptiles described in 1896
Taxa named by John Anderson (zoologist)